Lymantica is a genus of moths in the subfamily Lymantriinae. The genus was erected by Cyril Leslie Collenette in 1936.

Taxonomy
The Global Lepidoptera Names Index and Lepidoptera and Some Other Life Forms give this name as a synonym of Lymantria Hübner, [1819]. Afromoths lists it as a full genus with the species below.

Species listed by Afromoths
Lymantica arrheta (Collenette, 1959)
Lymantica canariensis (Kenrick, 1914)
Lymantica castaneostriata (Kenrick, 1914)
Lymantica cidariensis Kühne, 2010
Lymantica hypobolimaea (Collenette, 1959)
Lymantica leucophaes (Collenette, 1936)
Lymantica malgassica (Kenrick, 1914)
Lymantica phaeosericea (Mabille, 1884)
Lymantica pruinosa (Butler, 1879)
Lymantica radiata Griveaud, 1977
Lymantica rufofusca (Mabille, 1900)
Lymantica suarezia (Mabille, 1898)
Lymantica velutina (Mabille, 1879)
Lymantica xanthosoma (Saalmüller, 1884)

References

Lymantriinae